The 1991–92 New York Islanders season was the 20th season in the franchise's history. Denis Potvin's number 5 and Mike Bossy's number 22 were retired by the franchise.

Offseason

Regular season
Pat LaFontaine, frustrated with his situation on Long Island, turned down a four year, $6 million contract offer and refused to report to the Islanders for the start of the 1991–92 NHL season. Three weeks into the season, on 25 October 1991, LaFontaine was traded, along with teammate Randy Wood, to the Buffalo Sabres for four players, including former first overall pick Pierre Turgeon.

Also in October, Captain Brent Sutter is traded to the Chicago Blackhawks. Forward Patrick Flatley is named team captain.

Although they finished last in the NHL in penalty-killing percentage (76.50%), the Islanders had a good power-play unit, finishing third in the NHL with 22.12% (75 for 339).

Season standings

Schedule and results

Playoffs
For the second straight year, the Islanders failed to qualify for the playoffs.

Player statistics

Note: Pos = Position; GP = Games played; G = Goals; A = Assists; Pts = Points; +/- = plus/minus; PIM = Penalty minutes; PPG = Power-play goals; SHG = Short-handed goals; GWG = Game-winning goals
      MIN = Minutes played; W = Wins; L = Losses; T = Ties; GA = Goals-against; GAA = Goals-against average; SO = Shutouts; SA = Shots against; SV = Shots saved; SV% = Save percentage;

Awards and records

Transactions

Draft picks
New York's draft picks at the 1991 NHL Entry Draft held at the Buffalo Memorial Auditorium in Buffalo, New York.

See also
 1991–92 NHL season

References

New York Islanders seasons
New York Islanders
New York Islanders
New York Islanders
New York Islanders